Ancylosis nubeculella is a species of snout moth in the genus Ancylosis. It was described by Ragonot in 1887. It is found in Sudan, Saudi Arabia, Turkey, the southern Caucasus, Iran, Pakistan, Afghanistan, Egypt and the Canary Islands.

References

Moths described in 1887
nubeculella
Moths of Asia
Moths of Africa